LeRay Hotel, also known as Hoover Brick Hotel, is a historic hotel located at Evans Mills in Jefferson County, New York. It was completed in 1828 and is a two-story, Federal style brick structure with a shingled gable roof.  According to an unproven legend which is almost certainly untrue, It was the site of the card game in which presidential son John Van Buren lost his mistress, Elena America Vespucci, a descendant of Amerigo Vespucci, to George Parish II of Ogdensburg, New York.

It was listed on the National Register of Historic Places in 1982.

References

Hotel buildings on the National Register of Historic Places in New York (state)
Federal architecture in New York (state)
Hotel buildings completed in 1828
Buildings and structures in Jefferson County, New York
National Register of Historic Places in Jefferson County, New York